Actinoptera espunensis is a species of tephritid or fruit flies in the genus Actinoptera of the family Tephritidae.

Distribution
Spain.

References

Tephritinae
Insects described in 1934
Diptera of Europe